Guys from the Army Band is a 1960 Armenian comedy film directed by Henrik Malyan and Henrik Margaryan.

Plot
Bolshevik Tsolak Darbinyan infiltrates the Dashnak Army as a musician of the Army music band. Despite the initial personal conflict with band leader Arsen, he is able to win the friendship of young band musicians, including Arsen, and to persuade them to back him on the eve of the Bolshevik invasion to Armenia.

Cast
Levon Tukhikyan - Tsolak Darbinyan
Frunzik Mkrtchyan - Arsen
Armen Khostikyan - Zaven
Sos Sargsyan - Artashes

External links

1960 films
1960 comedy films
Soviet black-and-white films
Armenian-language films
Films directed by Henrik Malyan
Films set in Armenia
Soviet comedy films
Soviet-era Armenian films
Armenfilm films
Russian military bands
Armenian comedy films
Armenian black-and-white films